Lenoxx Electronics Corporation was an American distributor of electronic equipment. The brand appeared in the late 1980s as a transportable stereo (boombox) model.

Products from this company bear more than one brand. Common examples are Durabrand (Sold by Wal-Mart since early 2003), and Audio Solutions (sold by Walgreens). They also sell with their own name Lenoxx Sound. Market position is at the low end with products rarely over $80. The company's products are often sold at discount and drug stores, but rarely in other markets.

Bernard Fuchs was the company's Chief Executive Officer.

Lenoxx Electronics Corporation operated only in the United States and some countries in Europe, and should not be confused with Lenoxx Electronics of Australia.

Products
 Portable Compact Disc players
 CD Radio-Cassette Transportable Stereos (Boomboxes)
 Portable Televisions
 TV sets with screen size up to 21 inches (crt) or up to 26/32 inches (lcd) in some markets. 
 Portable Cassette
 Portable AM/FM Radio
 Alarm Clock Radio
 Telephones
 Home Theatre Systems
 PC speakers
 DVD players
 Compact hi-fi stereo systems.

References 

Electronics companies of the United States